The 2020 McDonald's All-American Girls Game was an all-star basketball game that was scheduled be held in 2020. The game's rosters featured the best and most highly recruited high school girls graduating in the class of 2020. The game would have been the 19th annual version of the McDonald's All-American Game first played in 2002. Due to the impact of the COVID-19 pandemic, the game was cancelled and the players were honored virtually. The 24 players were selected from over 700 nominees by a committee of basketball experts. They were chosen not only for their on-court skills, but for their performances off the court as well.

Rosters
The roster was announced on January 23, 2020. Oregon had the most selections with five, while Louisville, Syracuse, UConn had two selections each.

References

2020 in American women's basketball
2020